David Muir (born 1973) is an American television news reporter and presenter.

David Muir may also refer to:

 David S. Muir (born 1971), Scottish political communicator
 David Muir (footballer) (born 1971), Australian rules footballer for the Fremantle Dockers
 David Muir, actor in the film Dr. Hackenstein
 Sir David Muir, Agent-General for Queensland, 19511964

See also 

 Sir Richard David Muir (18571924), British prosecutor